Mwana may refer to
Mwana (name)
Mwana Mwinga, a settlement in Kenya
Mwana Africa F.C., a Zimbabwean football club
Aie a Mwana, a song by Daniel Vangarde and Jean Kluger